Kisegese is an administrative ward in the Busokelo District of the Mbeya Region of Tanzania. In 2016 the Tanzania National Bureau of Statistics report there were 6,074 people in the ward, from 5,511 in 2012.

Villages / vitongoji 
The ward has 3 villages and 12 vitongoji.

 Kiseges
 Kibanja
 Kisegese
 Lufilyo
 Mbiningu
 Ngeleka
 Isala
 Mbuyu
 Mwalisi
 Ngeleka A
 Ngeleka B
 Kasyabone
 Kasyabone
 Kiloba
 Ndobo

References 

Wards of Mbeya Region